Forever Delayed is a greatest hits album and DVD by Welsh alternative rock band Manic Street Preachers, released in 2002 by record label Epic. The album included three singles which had never appeared on earlier albums ("Motown Junk", "Suicide Is Painless" and the No. 1 hit "The Masses Against the Classes"), as well as two new songs, the single "There by the Grace of God" and "Door to the River".

The album peaked and debuted on the UK Album Chart at number 4.

Content 

The album featured two new songs: the single "There by the Grace of God" and "Door to the River". "Door to the River" was originally recorded in the sessions for the Know Your Enemy album, but the band deemed the song too unfitting to the album's general style. "There by the Grace of God" could be seen as a foreshadowing of what followed the hits compilation, as it features a more electronic/keyboard-heavy style that would eventually be the main style of the band's next studio album, Lifeblood.

Several songs were edited for length ("Motorcycle Emptiness", "La Tristesse Durera (Scream to a Sigh)", "You Love Us", "Australia", "From Despair to Where", "Everything Must Go", "Little Baby Nothing" and "The Everlasting") so that more tracks could fit onto the CD (though not listed as edits in the liner notes).

The title of Forever Delayed is lifted from the lyrics of their song "Roses in the Hospital" (which does not feature on the CD album). A song called "4 Ever Delayed" was recorded for inclusion but ended up not being included. Plans of releasing it as part of a new two-disc edition of the compilation and as CD single were then toyed with but never surfaced. It eventually wound up on the band's following B-sides and rarities compilation Lipstick Traces (A Secret History of Manic Street Preachers) in 2003. The title of the greatest hits package had also been planned for several years previous; Nicky Wire first mentioned it in Simon Price's biography Everything – A Book About Manic Street Preachers, published in 1998.

Release 

The compilation album reached number 4 in the UK Albums Chart, and spent a total of 19 weeks in the Top 75. To date it has gone Double Platinum (600,000 copies) in the UK. It reached number 7 in Ireland and in Finland, and it also charted within the Top 20 in Denmark. The album has sold more than one million copies since its release in 2002.

The album was promoted by the introduction of new songs such as "Door to the River" and by the single "There by the Grace of God", which peaked and debuted at number 6 in the UK Singles Chart.

The Forever Delayed DVD was released in 2002 together with the greatest hits CD and photo book that bear the same name, and features all the promo music videos from the start of the band's career released prior to the DVD. Along with the promo videos there is a selection of 14 remix videos, where the visual material is taken from clips of the other promo videos as well as backdrop visuals from the band's live concerts.

Reception 

Forever Delayed is the first of three compilation albums by the Manic Street Preachers, and it was not well received by NME that stated: "So here it is, The Album That Should Not Exist. To the slogan-smothered, soul-bruised, scarred-for-the-cause skunkpunk heroes of 1991 - the scary/beautiful freaks claiming they'll self-destruct after one six million-selling album - this greatest hits would be musical treachery."

Allmusic rated the album with a 4 out of 5, saying: "Manic Street Preachers have always been a band of very specific charms, something that has not translated outside of the U.K. particularly well. Although it boasts a generous 20 tracks, the 2002 compilation Forever Delayed isn't likely to change that situation, even if it has the lion's share of their big singles, since a band devoted to sloganeering doesn't play outside of their province, or era, without some knowledge of their context."

Sputnikmusic made a track-by-track review, finishing with: "Overall I'd say this is a great introduction to the Manics, but it's nowhere near definitive. It's missing songs too many good songs (Slash N Burn especially), and it's far too biased towards This Is My Truth Tell Me Yours."

Track listing

Album

DVD 

 Bonus remix videos

 "La Tristesse Durera (Scream to a Sigh)" (The Chemical Brothers remix)
 "If You Tolerate This Your Children Will Be Next" (David Holmes remix)
 "Tsunami" (Cornelius remix)
 "So Why So Sad" (Avalanches remix)
 "Faster" (The Chemical Brothers remix)
 "If You Tolerate This Your Children Will Be Next" (Massive Attack remix)
 "Kevin Carter" (Jon Carter remix)
 "You Stole the Sun from My Heart" (David Holmes remix)
 "Tsunami" (Stereolab remix)
 "Let Robeson Sing" (Ian Brown remix)
 "The Everlasting" (Stealth Sonic Orchestra remix)
 "You Stole the Sun from My Heart" (Mogwai remix)
 "A Design for Life" (Stealth Sonic Orchestra remix)
 "Ocean Spray" (Kinobe remix)

Credits 

 Tracks 1, 3, 5, 7, 8, 10, 11, 13, 14, 18 and 19:
 Lyrics by Nicky Wire
 Music by James Dean Bradfield and Sean Moore
 Tracks 2, 4, 6, 12, 15, 16 and 20:
 Lyrics by Nicky Wire and Richey James Edwards
 Music by James Dean Bradfield and Sean Moore
 Track 9:
 Lyrics by Richey James Edwards
 Music by James Dean Bradfield, Nicky Wire and Sean Moore
 Track 17:
 Written by Mike Altman and Johnny Mandel

Charts and certifications

Weekly charts

Year-end charts

Certifications

References

External links 

 

Manic Street Preachers compilation albums
2002 greatest hits albums